Taj Mahal Bangladesh is an architectural imitation of Taj Mahal, a Mughal mausoleum in Agra, India,. The structure was built by Ahsanullah Moni, a Bangladeshi film-maker, as a tourism destination for low-income families from Bangladesh. Construction of the 1.6 hectare complex took five years from 2003 to 2008, and cost about $58 million. It was opened to the public in March, 2009.

Controversy 
The Indian High Commission expressed concern about possible copyright infringement of the original building, despite it being "unlikely to detract from the magnificence of the original".

See also

 Taj Mahal replicas and derivatives

References

External links

 Bangladesh to open own Taj Mahal
 Replica of Taj Mahal opens to public in Bangladesh
 Bangladesh gets its own Taj

Taj Mahal
Bengal
Monuments and memorials in Bangladesh
Tourist attractions in Dhaka
Replica buildings